LiveScript is a functional programming language that transpiles to JavaScript. It was created by Jeremy Ashkenas—the creator of CoffeeScript—along with Satoshi Muramaki, George Zahariev, and many others. (The name may be an homage to the beta name of JavaScript; for a few months in 1995, it was called LiveScript before the official release.)

Syntax 
LiveScript is an indirect descendant of CoffeeScript. The following hello world program is written in LiveScript, but is also compatible with Coffeescript:

hello = ->
  console.log 'hello, world!'

While calling a function can be done with empty parens, hello(), LiveScript treats the exclamation mark as a single-character shorthand for function calls with zero arguments: hello!

LiveScript introduces a number of other incompatible idioms:

Name mangling 
At compile time, the LiveScript parser implicitly converts kebab case (dashed variables and function names) to camel case.

hello-world = ->
  console.log 'Hello, World!'

With this definition, both the following calls are valid. However, calling using the same dashed syntax is recommended.

hello-world!
helloWorld!

This does not preclude developers from using camel case explicitly or using snake case. Dashed naming is however, common in idiomatic LiveScript

Pipes 
Like a number of other functional programming languages such as F# and Elixir, LiveScript supports the pipe operator, |> which passes the result of the expression on the left of the operator as an argument to the expression on the right of it. Note that in F# the argument passed is the last argument, while in Elixir it is the first.

"hello!" |> capitalize |> console.log
# > Hello!

Operators as functions 

When parenthesized, operators such as not or + can be included in pipelines or called as if they were functions.

111 |> (+) 222
# > 333

(+) 1 2
# > 3

References

External links 
 

JavaScript programming language family
Software using the MIT license